Mittlerspitz is a mountain on the border of Liechtenstein and Switzerland in the Rätikon range of the Eastern Alps east of the town of Balzers, with a height of .

See also 
Würznerhorn
Mittagspitz

References

 
 

Mountains of Switzerland
Mountains of Liechtenstein
Liechtenstein–Switzerland border
International mountains of Europe
Mountains of Graubünden
Mountains of the Alps
One-thousanders of Switzerland